Roystonea lenis is a species of palm which is endemic to Guantánamo Province in eastern Cuba.

Description
Stems are grey-white and are usually  in diameter. Individuals have about 15 leaves with  petioles and  rachises; the leaves hang well horizontal. The  inflorescences bear white male and female flowers.

References

lenis
Endemic flora of Cuba
Trees of Cuba
Guantánamo Province